PET Container Recycling Europe, commonly known as Petcore, is a Brussels-based non-profit European trade association.

Petcore was founded in 1993 to promote the collection, sorting and recycling of post-consumer PET bottles. It networks with national collection agencies, governments, and the recycling industry. Used PET, or polyethylene terephthalate bottles are light-weight but once collected, sorted and pressed into bales, they become a valuable raw material for a range of products. End markets for recycled PET include polyester fibre, sheet, strapping, and new bottles.

PET collection
In 2011, 1,587,000 tons of PET were collected and recycled in Europe, representing a collection rate of over 51 percent. This collection has been growing by an average of 20% per year but the rate is slowing as collection schemes in most EU countries are maturing. (Source:  PCI PET Packaging report for Petcore and EuPR)

See also
 PET bottle recycling
 Container-deposit legislation

External links
Petcore Europe Official Website
Industrial Shredders Recycling Equipment

Recycling organizations
Waste organizations
European trade associations